Lars Håland (born 28 July 1962) is a former Swedish cross-country skier who competed from 1986 to 1999. He won two medals at the 1989 FIS Nordic World Ski Championships, with a gold in the 4 × 10 km relay, and a bronze in the 15 km freestyle. Håland also earned his only World Cup victory at Falun, Sweden in 1989.

He competed for the club Svenska Skidspelen Falun throughout his career.

Cross-country skiing results
All results are sourced from the International Ski Federation (FIS).

Olympic Games

World Championships
 2 medals – (1 gold, 1 bronze)

World Cup

Season standings

Individual podiums
 1 victory 
 3 podiums

Team podiums
 3 victories 
 10 podiums 

Note:  Until the 1999 World Championships, World Championship races were included in the World Cup scoring system.

References

External links

Swedish male cross-country skiers
1962 births
Living people
FIS Nordic World Ski Championships medalists in cross-country skiing
Dala-Järna IK skiers
Åsarna IK skiers
Sportspeople from Stockholm